Charles Dean Britz (November 7, 1927 – August 21, 2000) was a recording engineer who worked with Jan and Dean, Brian Wilson and The Beach Boys, P.F. Sloan and The Grass Roots on numerous albums between 1962 and 1967.

Biography
Britz was born in 1927  to Charles and Elsie Britz in Cameron, Oklahoma. He was involved in long-range photography with the Army Air Corps fifth reconnaissance squadron from 1945 to 1947. He began his career in the recording industry in 1952, recording big bands for the Armed Forces Networks and the Salvation Army Band. In 1960, Britz went to work at Western Recorders and began engineering numerous rock n' roll records. Britz met Brian Wilson when the Beach Boys were cutting demos at Western Recorders. Influential in Wilson's development as a musician, he would go on to record and mix most of their hit records between 1963 and 1967. He worked with Jan and Dean and through this association later with P.F. Sloan and The Grass Roots. He also recorded music for TV and movies.

Britz died of brain cancer in Paradise, California at the age of 72.

References

External links

1927 births
2000 deaths
American audio engineers
People from Le Flore County, Oklahoma
United States Army Air Forces soldiers
United States Army Air Forces personnel of World War II
20th-century American male musicians
Deaths from brain cancer in the United States
20th-century American engineers